Hu Dagmar (Wow, Dagmar) is a Norwegian drama comedy film from 1939 directed by Rasmus Breistein. It is based on Ove Ansteinsson's play Hu Dagmar. Breistein and Ansteinsson also wrote the film's script together. The film stars Randi Heide Steen, Arne Bang-Hansen, and Eva Sletto.

Plot
Sjur returns one summer day to his parents' home at Råvangen. He has just become a corporal in Oslo, and he brings with him his fiancée Dagmar, a beautiful and distinctively city girl. Dagmar will live at Råvangen this summer, while Sjur travels around the heath. Dagmar is met with great skepticism both by Sjur's family and by the villagers, and not least by Ingeborg, Sjur's old girlfriend. It does not take long before Dagmar flirts wildly with the men in the village and not even Sjur's father, Ola, escapes her influence. When Sjur comes home, the couple goes out to dance. Dagmar dances with many men, Sjur gets drunk, and Ingeborg takes care of him. A few days later, one of Dagmar's admirers, Jens, comes and offers her NOK 5,000 to end her engagement with Sjur and marry him instead. Dagmar needs the money and therefore agrees. However, the money has been stolen, and Dagmar is forced to pay it back. Sjur returns to Ingeborg and is happy that his relationship with Dagmar is over.

Cast
 Arne Bang-Hansen as Sjur
 Randi Heide Steen as Dagmar
 Eva Sletto as Ingeborg
 Einar Vaage as Ola Råvangen
 Tove Bryn as Marte-Marja, Ola's wife
 Martin Gisti as Embret Storberget
 Toralf Sandø as Jens Sigfridstad
 Olga Sjøgren as Olina, a servant girl
 Alfred Solaas as Olaf, a farm boy at Råvangen
 Alf Sommer as Mentz
 Astrid Sommer as Berte-Marja

References

External links
 
 Hu Dagmar at the National Library of Norway
 Hu Dagmar at Filmfront

1939 films
Norwegian black-and-white films
1939 comedy-drama films
Norwegian comedy-drama films
Films directed by Rasmus Breistein